The Shire of Enoggera is a former local government area of Queensland, Australia, located in north-western Brisbane.

History
Ithaca Division was one of the original divisions created on 11 November 1879 under the Divisional Boards Act 1879. It comprised 3 subdivisions. By 1886, the residents of subdivision 1 were petitioning to separate and become the Shire of Windsor, resulting in the establishment of the Shire of Windsor on 11 February 1887. Meanwhile, the residents of subdivision 2 were petitioning to separate and become the Shire of Ithaca, resulting in the creation of the Shire of Ithaca on 18 August 1887.

The now much-depleted Ithaca Division then requested to be renamed the Enoggera Division and this occurred on 28 March 1888.

The Local Authorities Act 1902 replaced divisions with shires and towns. As a result, on 31 March 1903, the Enoggera Division became the Shire of Enoggera.

On 1 October 1925, the shire was amalgamated into the City of Brisbane.

Chairmen

The chairmen of the division and shire were:
 1880–1882: John Lloyd Bale
 1883–1885: John Guthrie
 1886–1887: Jesse Paten
 1888: William McCallum Park
 1889–1890: John Scott Mullin
 1891: William Peter Gordon
 1892: Edward Joseph Corbett of Killarney
 1893: Jesse Paten
 1894–95: Charles Henry Chamberlain
 1896–98: James Fred Cole
 1899: Thomas Marshall senior
 1900: James Fred Cole, then Jesse Paten
 1901: John Francis Bergin
 1902: John Tate
 1903: David Lanham, later Thomas Robinson
 1904: David Lanham
 1905: James Fred Cole
 1906: Alfred Pickering
 1907: David Lanham
 1908: John Tate
 1909 Mr Marshall junior
 1910: John Francis Bergin
 1911: William Harwood Ashton
 1912: George Oakden
 1913: John Francis Bergin
 1914: James Fred Cole
 1915: Alfred Pickering
 1916: Henry Willmington
 1917: Henry Hilder
 1918: Walter Woodcock
 1919: James Fred Cole
 1920–24: Thomas Pratt

References

Former local government areas of Queensland
Enoggera, Queensland
1879 establishments in Australia
1925 disestablishments in Australia